Fourth Allied Tactical Air Force (4 ATAF) was a NATO military formation under Allied Air Forces Central Europe tasked with providing air support to NATO's Central Army Group (CENTAG) in the southern portion of West Germany. 4 ATAF commanded all flying units based within its sector and all reinforcements flying into its sector, as well as ground-based radar systems and stations, air defense units and the airfields in its sector.

History
Fourth Allied Tactical Air Force was formed in 1951 with its area of responsibility covering Germany south of the city of Kassel. Commander of Fourth Allied Tactical Air Force at its inception was the commanding Major General of the American Twelfth Air Force based in the southwest of Germany. After Twelfth Air Force returned to the continental United States in 1958, the commander of Seventeenth Air Force took over command of Fourth Allied Tactical Air Force.

Headquarters 4 ATAF moved several times over more than forty years. Established about 1951 at Trier Air Base, the headquarters was moved to Ramstein Air Base in November 1957 where it remained until December 1980 when it was moved to Heidelberg where it was colocated with Headquarters Central Army Group. An operational Air Defence Operations Centre was operated at Ouvrage Molvange from 1961 until 1967 when it was moved to a USAF site in Kindsbach just south of Ramstein Air Base. The headquarters also operated a number of communications sites which were concerned with secure communications for the release of tactical nuclear weapons through the NATO Quick Reaction Alert Force. In 1985 NATO began with the construction of a new Static War Headquarters bunker in Ruppertsweiler, Germany. Fourth Allied Tactical Air Force commanded alongside Seventeenth Air Force, the U.S. 32nd Army Air Defense Command, 1 Canadian Air Group and two German Air Force (Luftwaffe) divisions, as well as extensive secure communications, air defense and radar installations manned by Germany and the U.S. Air Force.

If needed, 4 ATAF would have been reinforced with units from the US Third (UK based), Eighth (reconnaissance and bombing), Ninth (immediate reinforcements) and Twelfth Air Force (follow on reinforcements), and with Royal Canadian Air Force and French Air Force units. At the start of hostilities 4 ATAF would have had immediately around 600 combat aircraft at its disposal. 

4 ATAF was disbanded on 30 June 1993, with its duties taken over by Allied Air Forces Central Europe. Prior to that point, the following units would have come under command of Fourth Allied Tactical Air Force during wartime:

Wartime organization c.1989 

 Fourth Allied Tactical Air Force, Heidelberg, FRG
 Air Defence Operations Center (ADOC), Maastricht
 Sector Operations Center 3 (SOC 3), Sembach Air Base
 1st Btn, 32nd (Luftwaffe) Signal Regiment, Control and Reporting Center Börfink
 2nd Btn, 32nd (Luftwaffe) Signal Regiment, Control and Reporting Center Lauda-Königshofen
 4th Btn, 32nd (Luftwaffe) Regiment, Lauda-Königshofen, with 12x mobile Radar systems forward deployed to the inner German border.
 Sector Operations Center 4 (SOC 4), Meßstetten
 1st Btn, 31st (Luftwaffe) Signal Regiment, Control and Reporting Center Meßstetten
 2nd Btn, 31st (Luftwaffe) Signal Regiment, Control and Reporting Center Freising

Seventeenth Air Force 
 Seventeenth Air Force, (US Air Force) Sembach Air Base
 65th Air Division, at Lindsey Air Station
 52nd Tactical Fighter Wing, at Spangdahlem Air Base
 23rd Tactical Fighter Squadron, with 12x F-4G Phantom II Wild Weasel and 12x F-16C Block 25 Falcon
 81st Tactical Fighter Squadron, with 12x F-4G Phantom II Wild Weasel and 12x F-16C Block 25 Falcon
 480th Tactical Fighter Squadron, with 12x F-4G Phantom II Wild Weasel and 12x F-16C Block 25 Falcon
 66th Electronic Combat Wing, at Sembach Air Base
 43rd Electronic Combat Squadron, with EC-130H Compass Call
 316th Air Division, at Ramstein Air Base
 86th Tactical Fighter Wing, at Ramstein Air Base
 512th Tactical Fighter Squadron, with 24x F-16C Block 30 Falcon
 526th Tactical Fighter Squadron, with 24x F-16C Block 30 Falcon
 26th Tactical Reconnaissance Fighter Wing, at Zweibrücken Air Base
 38th Tactical Reconnaissance Squadron, with 22x RF-4C Phantom II
 36th Tactical Fighter Wing, at Bitburg Air Base
 22nd Tactical Fighter Squadron, with 24x F-15C Eagle
 53rd Tactical Fighter Squadron, with 24x F-15C Eagle
 525th Tactical Fighter Squadron, with 24x F-15C Eagle
 50th Tactical Fighter Wing, at Hahn Air Base
 10th Tactical Fighter Squadron, with 24x F-16C Block 25 Falcon
 313th Tactical Fighter Squadron, with 24x F-16C Block 25 Falcon
 496th Tactical Fighter Squadron, with 24x F-16C Block 25 Falcon
 601st Tactical Control Wing, at Sembach Air Base (operating AN/TPS-43 mobile radars)

32nd Army Air Defense Command 
 32nd Army Air Defense Command, (US Army) Darmstadt
 Headquarters and Headquarters Battery, Darmstadt
 11th Signal Battalion (Air Defense), Darmstadt
 10th Air Defense Artillery Brigade, Darmstadt
 Headquarters and Headquarters Battery, Darmstadt
 2nd Battalion, 43rd Air Defense Artillery, Hanau, (48x MIM-104 Patriot)
 4th Battalion, 43rd Air Defense Artillery, Giessen, (48x MIM-104 Patriot)
 3rd Battalion, 52nd Air Defense Artillery, Wildflecken, (24x MIM-23 Hawk, 8x FIM-92 Stinger)
 69th Air Defense Artillery Brigade, Würzburg
 Headquarters and Headquarters Battery, Würzburg
 6th Battalion, 43rd Air Defense Artillery, Ansbach, (48x MIM-104 Patriot)
 8th Battalion, 43rd Air Defense Artillery, Giebelstadt, (48x MIM-104 Patriot)
 6th Battalion, 52nd Air Defense Artillery, Würzburg, (24x MIM-23 Hawk, 8x FIM-92 Stinger)
 3rd Battalion, 60th Air Defense Artillery, Grafenwöhr, (24x MIM-23 Hawk, 8x FIM-92 Stinger, disbanded November 1989)
 94th Air Defense Artillery Brigade, Kaiserslautern
 Headquarters and Headquarters Battery, Kaiserslautern
 4th Battalion, 1st Air Defense Artillery, Neubrücke, (24x MIM-23 Hawk, 8x FIM-92 Stinger)
 1st Battalion, 7th Air Defense Artillery, Kaiserslautern, (48x MIM-104 Patriot)
 3rd Battalion, 44th Air Defense Artillery, Ramstein, (24x MIM-72 Chaparral, 24x M163 VADS Vulcan, 15x FIM-92 Stinger)
 108th Air Defense Artillery Brigade, Spangdahlem
 Headquarters and Headquarters Battery, Spangdahlem
 1st Battalion, 1st Air Defense Artillery, Spangdahlem, (24x MIM-23 Hawk, 8x FIM-92 Stinger)
 4th Battalion, 7th Air Defense Artillery, Dexheim, (48x MIM-104 Patriot)
 5th Battalion, 7th Air Defense Artillery, Bitburg, (48x MIM-104 Patriot)
 5th Battalion, 44th Air Defense Artillery, Spangdahlem, (24x MIM-72 Chaparral, 24x M163 VADS Vulcan, 15x FIM-92 Stinger)
 32nd Support Command (Air Defense), Worms
 Headquarters and Headquarters Company, Worms
 334th Ordnance Company, Wildflecken
 565th Ordnance Company, Pirmasens
 569th Ordnance Company, Würzburg
 574th Ordnance Company, Grafenwöhr
 576th Ordnance Company, Neubrücke
 606th Ordnance Company, Bitburg Air Base
 611th Ordnance Company, Bruchmühlbach-Miesau (Miesau Ammunition Depot)
 820th Ordnance Company, Bitburg Air Base
 19th Maintenance Company, Bitburg Air Base
 57th Maintenance Company, Giebelstadt Army Airfield
 91st Maintenance Company, Ansbach
 178th Maintenance Company, Dexheim
 518th Maintenance Company, Giessen
 549th Maintenance Company, Kaiserslautern
 555th Maintenance Company, Hanau
 247th Chemical Detachment, Darmstadt

1. Luftwaffendivision 
 1. Luftwaffendivision (German Air Force), Fürstenfeldbruck
 Bremgarten Air Base
 Aufklärungsgeschwader 51, 2 x squadrons with 15 x RF-4E (Reconnaissance)
 Landsberg am Lech
 Flugkörpergeschwader 1, 4 x squadrons with 9 x Pershing 1a
 Lechfeld Air Base
 Jagdbombergeschwader 32, 2 x squadrons with 16 x Tornado IDS each, and 6x Tornado IDS in reserve
 Büchel Air Base
 Jagdbombergeschwader 33note 1, 2x squadrons with 16x Tornado IDS each, and 6x Tornado IDS in reserve
 Memmingen Air Base
 Jagdbombergeschwader 34note 1, 2x squadrons with 16x Tornado IDS each, and 6x Tornado IDS in reserve
 Pferdsfeld Air Base
 Jagdbombergeschwader 35, 2x squadrons with 15x F-4F each, and 4x F-4F in reserve
 Leipheim Air Base
 Jagdbombergeschwader 44, 1st squadron permanently deployed to Beja Airbase in Portugal with 18x Alpha Jets for weapons training
 Fürstenfeldbruck Air Base
 Jagdbombergeschwader 49, 2x squadrons with 18x Alpha Jets each, and 24x Alpha Jets in reserve (18x for 2nd squadron Jagdbombergeschwader 44)

2. Luftwaffendivision 
 2. Luftwaffendivision (German Air Force), Birkenfeld
 Neuburg Air Base
 Jagdgeschwader 74, 2x squadrons with 15x F-4F each, and 4x F-4F in reserve
 4th Air Defense Missile Command, Lich
 21st Air Defense Missile Wing, Möhnesee, with 6x MIM-104 Patriot squadrons; each with 1x Engagement Control Station, 1x Radar Set, 8x launch stations
 38th Air Defense Missile Wing, Burbach, with 4x MIM-23 Hawk squadrons; each with 1x Hawk battery (6x launch stations)
 42nd Air Defense Missile Group, Schöneck, with 42x Roland systems guarding Rhein-Main, Sembach, Nörvenich, Pferdsfeld and Büchel air bases and Lindsey Air Station
 5th Air Defense Missile Command, Erding
 23rd Air Defense Missile Wing, Manching, with 6x MIM-104 Patriot squadrons; each with 1x Engagement Control Station, 1x Radar Set, 8x launch stations
 32nd Air Defense Missile Wing, Freising, with 4x MIM-23 Hawk squadrons; each with 1x Hawk battery (6x launch stations)
 34th Air Defense Missile Wing, Rottenburg an der Laaber, with 4x MIM-23 Hawk squadrons; each with 1x Hawk battery (6x launch stations)
 6th Air Defense Missile Command, Lenggries
 22nd Air Defense Missile Wing, Penzing, with 6x MIM-104 Patriot squadrons; each with 1x Engagement Control Station, 1x Radar Set, 8x launch stations
 33rd Air Defense Missile Wing, Lenggries, with 4x MIM-23 Hawk squadrons; each with 1x Hawk battery (6x launch stations)
 43rd Air Defense Missile Group, Leipheim, with 26x Roland systems guarding Lechfeld, Memmingen, Erding, Neuburg and Bremgarten air bases

1 Canadian Air Division 
 1 Canadian Air Divisionnote 2 (Canadian Forces), CFB Baden-Söllingen
 1 Wing CFB Lahr
 416 Tactical Fighter Squadron or 441 Tactical Fighter Squadron from CFB Cold Lake, 18x CF-18
 425 Tactical Fighter Squadron or 433 Tactical Fighter Squadron from CFB Bagotville, 18x CF-18
 444 Tactical Helicopter Squadron (detached to 4 Canadian Mechanized Brigade Group), (CH136 Kiowa, UH1N)
 Detachment Lahr, 412 Transport Squadron, 2x CC-142 Dash 8
 129 Air Defence Battery (detached from 4 Air Defence Regiment, Royal Regiment of Canadian Artillery, 4x ADATS, 8x 35mm Skyguard)
 4 Wing CFB Baden-Söllingen
 409 Tactical Fighter Squadron, 18x CF-18
 421 Tactical Fighter Squadron, 18x CF-18
 439 Tactical Fighter Squadron, 18x CF-18
 Training Flight, 5x CT-133 Silver Star
 128 Air Defence Battery (detached from 4 Air Defence Regiment, Royal Regiment of Canadian Artillery, 4x ADATS, 8x 35mm Skyguard)

note 1: Nuclear sharing unit capable of delivering tactical nuclear weapons.
note 2: The Canadian Forces NATO reinforcement units were two Fighter Squadrons rotated from CFB Cold Lake with 416 Tactical Fighter Squadron and 441 Tactical Fighter Squadron, and from CFB Bagotville with 425 Tactical Fighter Squadron and 433 Tactical Fighter Squadron each with 18x CF-18. These forces represented the complete combat-capable assets of Canadian Forces Air Command. The units marked as reinforcements were nominally assigned to the NORAD Canada East and Canada West regions, the plan being that once the two squadrons were deployed to NATO there would be two squadrons remaining with NORAD (one squadron in each region).

See also
Second Allied Tactical Air Force

References

 Dragoner, O.W. Die Bundeswehr 1989 Volume 2.1, available here
 Dragoner, O.W. Die Bundeswehr 1989 Volume 3, available here
 Pedlow, Gregory W. The Evolution of NATO’s Command Structure, 1951–2009 available 

Structures of military commands and formations in 1989
Formations of the NATO Military Command Structure 1952–1994
1951 establishments in Germany
Military units and formations disestablished in 1993
Tactical air forces
Multinational air units and formations
Military history of Europe